Segovci is a village on the right bank of the Mura River in the Municipality of Apače in northeastern Slovenia, on the border with Austria.

References

External links 
Segovci on Geopedia

Populated places in the Municipality of Apače